Roman Catholic Diocese of Sultanpet is a Roman Catholic diocese consisting of Palakkad district, Kerala, India erected from the division of the Roman Catholic Diocese of Coimbatore and Roman Catholic Diocese of Calicut, and a suffragan of the Roman Catholic Archdiocese of Verapoly. Rev. Peter Abir Antonisamy clergy of Archdiocese of Pondicherry and Cuddalore was appointed as its first bishop. The parish church of San Sebastian, located in Sultanpet in the city of Palakkad, is the cathedral of this diocese. At the time of its erection it was the 31st Catholic diocese in Kerala and  167th in India. The diocese is almost coterminous with the Syro-Malabar Catholic Diocese of Palghat.

Parish Council Members
 Vicar General     : Rev Fr. A.S.Madhalai Muthu
 Parish President  : Rev Fr. Jabamalai Lorance L
 Vice President    : Christu raj
 Secretary         : Justin
 Joint secretary   : Antony

References

External links
 Diocese of Sultanpet at Catholic-Hierarchy 
 Diocese of Sultanpet at GCatholic.org 

Roman Catholic dioceses in India
Roman Catholic dioceses and prelatures established in the 21st century
Dioceses in Kerala
Churches in Palakkad district